Abdul Jabbar (1945 – 28 August 1992) was an Awami League politician, activist and a Jatiya Sangsad member representing now-defunct Sylhet-13 constituency. He was awarded a posthumous Ekushey Padak in 2020 for his contributions to the Bengali Language Movement and Bangladesh Liberation War. He was the founding General Secretary of the Awami League's Kulaura branch in 1964.

Early life and family
Jabbar was born in Kulaura, Moulvibazar, Sylhet district of the British India's Assam Province. He had two sons, Abu Zafar Raju, a Protocol Officer for the Prime Minister of Bangladesh, and Asm Kamrul Islam, former chairman of Kulaura Upazila and General Secretary of the Awami League's Kulaura branch.

Career 
Jabbar took part in numerous movements at the time such as the 1962 Education Movement, the 1966 Six point movement and the 1969 Mass uprising. He also contested in the 1970 Pakistani provincial elections. Abdul Jabbar played an organising role during the Bangladesh Liberation War of 1971.

Jabbar was elected to parliament from Sylhet-13 as a Awami League candidate in 1979. He was a founding member of the Bangabandhu Parishad and the Muktijoddha Sanghati Parishad. He was also a member of the Red Crescent Society and the Nirmul Committee.

Jabbar was a president of the Bangladesh Krishak League. He was detained for protesting against the assassination of Sheikh Mujibur Rahman and was tortured by Major S.H.M.B Noor Chowdhury. He was released from prison after 11 months, with the support of Brigadier General Amin Ahmed Chowdhury.

Death 
Jabbar died on 28 August 1992 from a heart attack. In 2020, he received a posthumous Ekushey Padak award.

References 

1945 births
1992 deaths
People from Kulaura Upazila
Awami League politicians
2nd Jatiya Sangsad members
Recipients of the Ekushey Padak